Epaksa is a South Korean Techno-trot singer. Born October 5, 1954 in Gyeonggi-do, his birth name is Lee Yong-Seok. "Techno-trot" is a fusion genre of music which was popular in 1990s and early 2000s, and was well known as speedy tempo.

Discography 

Sinbaram Epaksa Vol. 1 (1989)
Encyclopedia of Pon-Chak Party 1 & 2 (1996.04)
2002 E-Pak-Sa's Space Odyssey (1996)
5 cm Higher and Rising! (1996)
I'm Space Fantasy (with Denki Groove) (1997)
Space Fantasy (1st album) (2000.07)
Winter Tech-Pon (2000.11.22)
Pak Sa Revolution & Emotion (2nd album) (2001.01)
Asura-Bal-Bal-Ta (2012.08.23)

Television appearances
2020, King of Mask Singer (MBC): Contestant as "Firefly" (Episode 279)

References

External links 
 Magazine article on Epaksa in English
 Fan site in Japanese

Trot singers
South Korean male singers
South Korean male songwriters
1954 births
Living people